The Senate of the Ottoman Empire (or ; ; lit. "Assembly of Notables") was the upper house of the parliament of the Ottoman Empire, the General Assembly. Its members were appointed notables in the Ottoman government who, along with the elected lower house Chamber of Deputies, made up the General Assembly. It was created in its first incarnation according to the Ottoman constitution of 1876, which sought to reform the Ottoman Empire into a constitutional monarchy.

Members of the Senate were selected by the Sultan and their numbers were limited to one-third (1/3) of the membership of the representative Chamber of Deputies. Members and the president of the Senate were designated to be reliable and reputable leaders of the country, required to be at least 40 years old. Furthermore, according to the 62nd clause of the 1876 constitution, government ministers, provincial governors, military commanders, kazaskers, ambassadors, Eastern Orthodox patriarchs, rabbis, and army and navy feriks, if they met certain conditions, could also become Senate members through their offices.

Members of both houses, along with the government ministers led by the grand vizier (the de facto prime minister of the Ottoman Empire), met together once a year to discuss and compile a list of things for the sultan to enact in the following year, and to review his actions taken in the previous year. The same day, Senators would swear oaths to stay loyal to the constitution, the sultan, the nation, and their duties.

Bills and budgets passed by the Chamber of Deputies went to the Senate, where they were scrutinized in matters of religion, morality, economics, social issues, and military, and modified as necessary or sent back to the Chamber. The Senate also had the power to create original legislation itself.

First Constitutional Era (1876–1878)

 

The first Senate met on Monday, March 19, 1877. At the time that  served as the Senate president, there were 27 members.
When sultan Abdul Hamid II dissolved the parliament on February 13, 1878, the Senate ceased meeting, but its members continued to be paid government salaries and their status as military and political leaders remained unchanged.

Second Constitutional Era (1908–1920)

After the proclamation of the Second Constitutional Era, amendments were made to the 1876 constitution. According to these amendments, the Senate began to assemble every year at the beginning of November, convene at the pleasure of the sultan, and disassemble after four months. The Senate usually convened after the Chamber of Deputies. In extraordinary conditions, at the sultan's request, or after a written appeal signed by the majority of the Chamber of Deputies, the entire parliament could convene earlier in a joint session of the Senate and the Chamber and extend the session.

On December 17, 1908, the Senate reconvened for the first time in over 30 years, several of its members changing over time until its end at the end of World War I in 1920, when the Allied occupation of Constantinople forced the de jure closure of the parliament on March 16, 1920. The de facto closure came on April 11, when the sultan, under pressure from the invading Allies, officially proclaimed the parliament dissolved.

The successor to the Ottoman Senate, the Senate of the Republic was established after the proclamation of the Turkish Republic.

Members

First Constitutional Era (1876–1878)

 Abdul Hamid II – Monarch
  – President
 Ahmed Arifi Pasha – Vice President
  – Sultan's messenger
 Mehmed Namık Pasha – Field Marshal
  – Minister of the Navy
 Abdurrahman Sami Pasha
 
  – governor of Hejaz
 Dervish Pasha – governor of Ankara
 Moralı İbrahim Pasha – Minister of the Navy
 Ahmed Celal Pasha
  – Minister of Medical Education
 
  – Fatwa consultant (Fetva emini)

 Hacı Tahir Efendi – Minister of Civil Service Education
 M. Arif Efendi – former member in the Council of State
 Rıza Efendi – former judge in the Court of Cassation
 Bağdatlı Emin Efendi – member of the Council of State
 Yorgaki Efendi – member of the Council of State
 Daviçon Efendi – member of the Council of State
  – Ministry of Medical Education
 M. Emin Bey – former Chief Clerk of the Palace Registrar
 Düzoğlu Mihran Bey – member of the Council of State
 Aristarki Logofet Bey – member of the Council of State
 Damat Mahmud İbrahim Pasha
 Kostaki Musurus Pasha – ambassador to Britain
 A. Hilmi Efendi – President of the Department of Appeals
 Kostaki Antopulos Pasha – judge in the Court of Cassation

 Abdülkerim Nadir Pasha
 Mehmed Sadık Pasha
 Ibrahim Edhem Pasha

Second Constitutional Era (1908–1920)
This incarnation of the Senate included two living members from the original 1877 Senate, for a total of 32 forming members. Although its charter called for it to have one-third the number of members of the Chamber of Deputies, i.e. over 90 members, it never reached that amount at one time. In 1909, it had 44 members; in 1910, it had 48 members; in 1911, it had 58 members; and in 1914, it had 48 members.

 Mehmed V – Monarch
 Ali Rıza Pasha – President
 
 Ahmet Tevfik Pasha
 Hasan Fehmi Pasha
 Mustafa Zihni Pasha
 Mehmed Tevfik Pasha
 Mısırlı Mehmed Ali Fazıl Paşa
 Ohannes Pasha
 General Arif Hikmet Pasha
 Gabriel Noradunkyan
 Ali Rıza Efendi
 Saib Molla Bey, until 1910
  – Artillery, General
 General Muhiddin Pasha
 General Süleyman Pasha
 General Mehmed Pasha
 Lieutenant general Şevket Pasha, until 1911
 Şerif Ali Haydar Bey
 Recaizade Mahmud Ekrem
 Abdurrahman Efendi
 
 Nasuhi Bey

 Faik Bey
 Halim Bey
 Dimitraki Mavrokordato
 Aleksandros Mavroyeni – former governor of Samos, diplomat
 Georgiadis Efendi
 Mustafa Nuri Bey
 Sami Pasha al-Farouqi
 Bohor Efendi
 Azaryan Efendi
 Mısırlı Halil Hamada Pasha
 
 Metropolit Avxentios
 Bessaraya Efendi
  – Seyyid Abdulkadir son of Sheikh Ubeydullah
 Ahmed Muhtar Pasha – Field Marshal
 Mehmed Said Pasha
 
 
 Aristarki Logofet Bey
 Fethi Franko Bey
 
 Abraham Pasha
 Aram Efendi
 Mehmet Cemaleddin Efendi – Shaykh al-Islām

 Mehmed Ferid Pasha – Grand Vizier
 Damat Ferid Pasha
 Hüseyin Hilmi Pasha – Grand Vizier
 Deli Fuad Pasha
 Şerif Nasser Bey
 
 Reshid Akif Pasha
 Salih Hulusi Pasha
 Mehmed Rauf Pasha
 
 Davud Molko Efendi
 Suleyman al-Boustani
 Zareh Dilber Efendi
 Ziyaeddin Efendi
 Mustafa Nail Bey
 Şerif Cafer Efendi - President of the Department of Appeals
 
 Stefanidis Vasileios
 Ahmet Rıza 
 Mizancı Murat
 Nicolae Constantin Batzaria
 Rıza Tevfik Bölükbaşı
 Şükrü Pasha
 Mahmud Shevket Pasha - General

See also
 Parliament of the Ottoman Empire, the parliament as a whole
 Chamber of Deputies of the Ottoman Empire, the lower house of the parliament
 Senate of Turkey, the upper house of the Turkish parliament between 1961 and 1980
 Ottoman constitution of 1876
 First Constitutional Era
 Second Constitutional Era

References

Notes

Government of the Ottoman Empire
1876 establishments in the Ottoman Empire
Defunct upper houses